Widodo Cahyono Putro (born 8 November 1970 in Cilacap, Central Java, Indonesia) is a retired Indonesian football player and current manager of Bhayangkara, who gained fame for scoring a goal with a bicycle kick in a match against Kuwait in the 1996 Asian Cup.

Club career 
Widodo Cahyono Putro began his career in Galatama with the club Warna Agung, shortly before the first national professional competition, the Liga Indonesia. For the 1994–1995 season began he was transferred to league runners-up Petrokimia Putra Gresik. Following consistent success there, in 1998–1999 he joined one of the major Jakartan clubs, Persija Jakarta, and at least he gained Indonesia League trophy with Petrokimia Gresik in 2002 and he retired in their club whose make his name famous Petrokimia gresik.

International career 
He received his first international cap in 1991 and retired from the Indonesia national football team in 1999, appearing in 55 matches. He was once again called to the national side for the 2000 AFC Asian Cup in Lebanon, but he did not make any appearances in the tournament. 1996 Asian Cup was the first time Indonesia qualified for the final round. In their first game against Kuwait, Widodo C Putro scored the first goal for Indonesia in the history of the tournament.

|}

Managerial career

Bali United 
On May 10, 2017, he was appointed as the head coach of Bali United. Putro eventually led his team to be the most productive team in the league with 76 goals, and finishing second in the league. On 29 November 2018, Putro decided to part ways with Bali United. There were some rumours stating that he left because of the dispute he had with Irfan Bachdim. However he stated that he was only following a clause in his contract that said the partnership would end if Bali United lost three in a row.

Persita Tangerang 
On 18 January 2019, Putro was officially appointed as Persita Tangerang new manager. Putro eventually brought his team to promotion by finishing as Liga 2 runners up.

Honours

Club
Persija Jakarta
 Liga Indonesia Premier Division: 2001

Petrokimia Putra
 Liga Indonesia Premier Division: 2002

National team 
Indonesia
 Southeast Asian Games  Gold medal: 1991

Individual
 Liga Indonesia Best Player : 1994–95
AFC Asian Cup Greatest Goals Bracket Challenge

References

External links 

1970 births
Living people
People from Cilacap Regency
Indonesian Christians
Indonesian footballers
Indonesia international footballers
1996 AFC Asian Cup players
Persija Jakarta players
Gresik United players
Association football forwards
Indonesian football managers
Gresik United managers
Bali United F.C. managers
Sriwijaya F.C. managers
Persita Tangerang managers
Southeast Asian Games gold medalists for Indonesia
Southeast Asian Games bronze medalists for Indonesia
Southeast Asian Games medalists in football
Competitors at the 1991 Southeast Asian Games
Competitors at the 1995 Southeast Asian Games
Competitors at the 1997 Southeast Asian Games
Sportspeople from Central Java